The Flaming Cliffs site (also known as Bayanzag, Bain-Dzak or Bayn Dzak) ( rich in saxaul), with the alternative Mongolian name of  (red cliffs), is a region of the Gobi Desert in the Ömnögovi Province of Mongolia, in which important fossil finds have been made. It was given this name by American paleontologist Roy Chapman Andrews, who visited in the 1920s. The area is most famous for yielding the first discovery of dinosaur eggs. Other finds in the area include specimens of Velociraptor  and eutherian mammals. It exposes rocks of the Djadochta Formation. It is illegal to remove fossils from the area without appropriate permits.

The nickname refers to the red or orange color of the sandstone cliffs (especially at a sunset),.

Dinosaur bones/fossils
The following are dinosaur fossils that have been found in the Flaming Cliffs.

Theropods:
Maniraptorans: Archaeornithoides, Velociraptor, Saurornithoides, Oviraptor

Ornithischians
Ceratopsians: Protoceratops
Ankylosaurids: Pinacosaurus

References

Further reading
 Carpenter, Kenneth (1999) Eggs, nests, and baby dinosaurs: a look at dinosaur reproduction Indiana University Press, Bloomington, Indiana, 
 Colbert, Edwin Harris (1984) The great dinosaur hunters and their discoveries Dover, New York, 
 Novacek, Michael J. (1997) Dinosaurs of the Flaming Cliffs Anchor, New York, 
 Novacek, Michael J.; Norell, Mark; McKenna, Malcolm C. and Clark, James (2004) "Fossils of the Flaming Cliffs" Dinosaurs and other Monsters (special edition of Scientific American 14(2):) Scientific American, New York, 

 
Gobi Desert
Deserts of Mongolia
Cretaceous paleontological sites of Asia